A Grand Army Man is a play by David Belasco. It played at the Stuyvestant Theatre in New York City in 1907 and 1908.

It played at the Hyperion Theatre. David Warfield starred. It toured in San Francisco.

The Grand Army of the Republic (GAR) was an organization of Union Army Civil War veterans.

A novelization by Harvey Jerrold O'Higgins was published in 1908.

References

1907 plays